John Jacob Palaeologus (Italian: Giovanni Giacomo Paleologo) (March 23, 1395 – March 12, 1445) was the Margrave of Montferrat from 1418 to 1445.

He was born in Trino, Piedmont, the son of Theodore II of Montferrat, with whom he collaborated in the government of the marquisate from 1404. His mother was Johanna of Bar, daughter of Robert of Bar and Marie of France, Duchess of Bar. In 1412 he married Joanna of Savoy, sister of Duke Amadeus VIII.

After his father's death in 1418, John Jacob received the investiture as Marquis by emperor Sigismund. He distinguished himself for some brilliant military campaign in the Apennines area; he also increased his prestige through the marriage between his sister Sofia and the second last Byzantine Emperor, John VIII Palaiologos.

John Jacob's expansion, however, spurred the reaction of the Dukes of Savoy and of Filippo Maria Visconti of Milan. In 1431 they signed an alliance aiming at the cancellation of the Montferrat state. John Jacob was therefore compelled to ask support to France. In 1432 he was defeated anyway and sued for peace, ceding several territories to Savoy but retaining the seigniory over Montferrat, although with the status of Savoy vassal.

However, when Amadeus VIII asked him the payment of the war expenses, John Jacob rebelled; but, after having besieged in Chivasso, he was forced to cease. His state and his prestige were shattered, and he had again to declare himself vassal of Savoy.

John Jacob died at Casale Monferrato in 1445, being succeeded by his son John IV.

Marriage and children 
John Jacob married on April 26, 1411 with Joanna of Savoy (1395–1460), daughter of Amadeus VII, Count of Savoy. They had :

 John IV (1413–1464), Marquis of Montferrat 1445–1464.
 Amadea (1418–1440), married to John II de Poitiers-Lusignan, king of Cyprus.
 Isabella (ca. 1419–1475); married to Ludovico I del Vasto, Marquis of Saluzzo.
 William VIII (1422–1483), Marquis of Montferrat 1464–1483.
 Boniface III (1424–1494), Marquis of Montferrat 1483–1494.
 Theodoro (1425–1481), cardinal.

Ancestry

References

Sources

See also
Wars in Lombardy

|-

1395 births
1445 deaths
People from Trino
15th-century Italian nobility
Palaiologos dynasty
Marquesses of Montferrat